Harry King (born 20 January 2001) is a British racing driver, who currently competes in the Porsche Supercup for  BWT Lechner Racing. King has previously competed in full seasons of the Ginetta Junior Championship and the Ginetta GT4 Supercup, winning the series championship in the latter, in 2019. In 2020, King won twelve out of sixteen races in the Porsche Carrera Cup Great Britain, to take the series title with a round to spare.

Career

Karting
King made his début in karting in 2012, winning two championships, before competing in the Cadets class of the Super 1 National Kart Championships in 2013. The following season, King won both the National Open – giving him the "O" plate in recognition – and overall championship titles in the F6 Cadets class. In his final season of karting, King competed in the Minimax Rotax Series, and finished second in the Minimax class of the Whilton Mill Kart Club Championships.

Ginetta Junior Championship
Having finished third in the Ginetta Junior scholarship, King made his car racing début in the 2015 Ginetta Junior Winter Series, competing in the four-race series at Snetterton for Elite Motorsport. He recorded finishes of fourth, sixth, ninth and eleventh – taking three rookie class victories – as he finished in ninth place in the series standings, winning the Rookie Cup in the process.

For the 2016 season, King moved into the main Ginetta Junior Championship, remaining with Elite Motorsport. In the first half of the season, King recorded a fastest lap in the first race at Thruxton, with his best finish to that point – fourth – coming in the second Thruxton race. He recorded two victories during the second half of the season, winning the final race of the Snetterton and Rockingham meetings, ending the season on a run of eight consecutive top-six finishes as he finished eighth in the overall championship and third in the Rookie Cup. He finished sixth in the following Winter Series, recording two fastest laps in the four-race Brands Hatch meeting.

Remaining with Elite Motorsport into the 2017 season, King started the season with a second-place finish in the opening race at Brands Hatch. Over the next seven meetings, King finished on the podium twice – a third-place finish at Thruxton, before his only win of the season at Knockhill – but his form improved as he finished the season with six consecutive podiums at Silverstone and Brands Hatch, as he improved to sixth in the final championship standings.

Ginetta GT4 Supercup
Although still eligible to continue in the Junior championship, King graduated into the Ginetta GT4 Supercup for the 2018 season, while also continuing his partnership with Elite Motorsport – their first season in the GT4 Supercup. King recorded two third-place finishes at the opening round at Brands Hatch, and recorded his first pole position, fastest lap and victory in the championship over the course of the following meeting at Donington Park. He added three further victories during the season – two at Snetterton, and one at Rockingham – and finished no lower than sixth during the final four meetings, as he finished third in the Pro championship, behind Charlie Ladell and Carl Boardley. King also made a one-off appearance in the Ginetta G40 Cup as a guest driver, where he won all three races at Brands Hatch.

King remained in the series for a second season in 2019, again with Elite Motorsport. King won at least one race at each of the season's eight meetings, as he won eleven races in total – more than double the tally of the next most successful drivers – en route to the championship title by thirteen points ahead of Will Burns.

Porsche Carrera Cup Great Britain
In November 2019, King was announced as the Porsche Carrera Cup GB Junior driver for the 2020 and 2021 seasons, and he signed a contract with Team Parker Racing in February 2020. The championship start was delayed from the end of March to the start of August due to the COVID-19 pandemic in the United Kingdom; at the season-opening meeting at Donington Park, King took pole position by two tenths of a second, and was leading the opening race of the weekend before clipping a tyre wall at the final chicane. The resulting damage from this hit slowed King's car, and as a result, he lost the race lead to teammate Josh Webster, but maintained second place until the end of the race. In the second race – with a partially-reversed grid – King started third but led by the end of the first lap, and ultimately went on to claim his first win in the series. King swept the races at Brands Hatch and Oulton Park, before his five-race win streak was ended at Knockhill, after he was forced to retire with a coolant leak. In the second race, King started from tenth on the grid but made his way through the order, passing erstwhile race leader Scott McKenna on the final lap to take the victory. King retired from the lead in both races at Thruxton due to punctures, but then won the last six races of the season – wrapping up the championship title with a round to spare.

During the sixteen-race 2020 season, King took seven pole positions from eight qualifying sessions, twelve wins, twelve fastest laps and thirteen podium finishes. For his performances, King was recognised as the National Driver of the Year by Autosport magazine in December 2020, the first time a Porsche Carrera Cup Great Britain driver had won the honour.

Porsche Supercup
In April 2021, it was announced that King was to combine his title defence in the Porsche Carrera Cup Great Britain with a Porsche Supercup campaign, both with Team Parker Racing. King made his debut in the new 992-spec car on a one-off outing in the Porsche Carrera Cup Benelux and took a pair of wins at the Red Bull Ring before his Supercup debut.

Racing record
Following the conclusion of the 2020 season, King has won 33 of the 124 races that he has entered, since making his racing début in 2015.

Career summary

† As King was a guest driver, he was ineligible for points.
* Season still in progress.

Complete Porsche Supercup results
(key) (Races in bold indicate pole position; races in italics indicate fastest lap)

References

External links

2001 births
Living people
English racing drivers
Porsche Carrera Cup GB drivers
Porsche Supercup drivers
Ginetta GT4 Supercup drivers
Ginetta Junior Championship drivers
Walter Lechner Racing drivers
24H Series drivers
Asian Le Mans Series drivers